Atopococcus tabaci  is a Gram-positive and aerobic bacterium from the genus of Atopococcus which has been isolated from tobacco in Sweden.

References

External links
Type strain of Atopococcus tabaci at BacDive -  the Bacterial Diversity Metadatabase	

Lactobacillales
Bacteria described in 2005
Alkaliphiles